Martha Graham Center of Contemporary Dance is located in New York City and is the headquarters to the Martha Graham School of Contemporary Dance and the Martha Graham Dance Company, which is the oldest continually performing contemporary dance company in the world. The School is focused on teaching Graham's technique; some of its faculty were trained by Graham herself.

The center was founded in 1926 by Martha Graham. Its first headquarters consisted of a small dance studio on Broadway. The center later moved to a two-story building at 316 East 63rd Street, New York.

After Martha Graham's death in 1991, the center's leadership was debated. In her will, Martha Graham left Ron Protas as heir to her estate. Protas claimed ownership of the rights to Graham's name and choreographic oeuvre, and sued the Martha Graham Dance Company for trademark infringement. After years of legal battles, the Martha Graham Dance Company was ruled the owner of the Graham name and almost all of her repertoire. During the dispute, Protas was voted out of his position as artistic director of the company.

In 2005, the center was among 406 New York City arts and social service institutions to receive part of a $20 million grant from the Carnegie Corporation, which was made possible through a donation that was given by the New York City mayor Michael Bloomberg.

See also
 Martha Graham
 Graham technique
 Modern Dance
 Denishawn

References

External links
 Martha Graham School of Contemporary Dance
 Martha Graham Dance Company
 Guide to the Barbara Morgan Photographs of Martha Graham and Company. Special Collections and Archives, The UC Irvine Libraries, Irvine, California.
 Martha Graham Center of Contemporary Dance at Google Cultural Institute

Martha Graham
Dance schools in the United States
1926 establishments in New York City
Non-profit organizations based in New York City
Education in New York City
Dance in New York City
Contemporary dance